Rajendra Nagar (often spelled Rajender Nagar) is a neighbourhood in Patna, Bihar, India. It is named after Rajendra Prasad, the first President of India. It is spread between Kumhrar road and Nala road from Dinkar golambar and Ramakrishna Avenue to Saidpur road. This area is served by Kadamkuan PS of Patna Police.

Overview
Rajendra Nagar is a planned colony divided by numbered roads. It has several open spaces like Parks and playing fields. Rajendra Nagar also hosts the biggest stadium of Bihar, Moin-ul-Haq Stadium (formerly Rajendra Nagar Stadium). In Rajendra Nagar one can find a variety of commercial establishments. Bank Branches, Hospitals, Hotels, restaurants, retail branded outlets etc. It is connected to Kankarbagh by Rajendra nagar over bridge. McDowell Golambar is a famous landmark of this locality.

Transport
Rajendra Nagar Terminal is the railway station for the Rajendra Nagar. It connects to many metropolitan cities of India by the Howrah-Delhi Main Line. The important trains include the Rajendra Nagar (Patna) Rajdhani Express, Rajendranagar Express (Patna- Mumbai), Patna- Indore Express etc.

References 

Neighbourhoods in Patna
Memorials to Rajendra Prasad